Essence of Emeril (1994–96, 2000–2007) is a Food Network show hosted by chef Emeril Lagasse.

In each episode, Emeril shares with his viewers some of his 'kicked-up' recipes, similar to those on Emeril Live, but with a far calmer demeanor and quieter tone, and usually without the trademark apron that has become his Emeril Live uniform starting with the 2000 season. In addition, unlike Emeril Live, there is no studio audience.

On some of the episodes, some of Emeril's friends/workers make an appearance. An example was when he invited three of his workers from his Homebase in Louisiana to cook up some healthy recipes.

His "Essence of Emeril" set has a wine cabinet, a built-in deep fryer, and other appliances. When he cooks with a specific ingredient he explains what it is and how it is made.

Food Network original programming
1994 American television series debuts
1990s American cooking television series
2000s American cooking television series
2007 American television series endings